The 1962 NCAA Track and Field Championships were contested June 16−17 at the 40th annual NCAA-sanctioned track meet to determine the individual and team national champions of men's collegiate track and field events in the United States. This year's meet was hosted by the University of Oregon at Hayward Field in Eugene. This was first time the event was held at Hayward, which hosted the championship thirteen more times.

This was the last championship before the NCAA split the championship into the two separate classes: the University Division (precursor to Division I) and the College Division (precursor to Divisions II and III). 

Oregon won the team national championship, the Ducks' first team title.

Team Result 
 Note: Top 10 only
 (H) = Hosts

References

NCAA Men's Outdoor Track and Field Championship
NCAA Track and Field Championships
NCAA
NCAA Track and Field Championships